The Peruvian Civil War of 1894–1895 was an internal conflict sparked by the election of Andrés Avelino Cáceres to the presidency of Peru. As Nicolás de Piérola and his forces entered the Peruvian capital, Lima, 1,000 people were killed. Cáceres resigned and Piérola became President of Peru.

Bibliography
 Basadre Grohmann, Jorge (1998). Historia de la República del Perú. 1822 - 1933, Octava Edición, corregida y aumentada. Tomo 9. Santiago de Chile: Diario "La República" de Lima y la Universidad "Ricardo Palma".
 Chirinos Soto, Enrique (1985). Historia de la República (1821-1930). Tomo I. Lima: AFA Editores Importadores S.A..
 Dixon, Jeffrey S. & Meredith Reid Sarkees (2015). A Guide to Intra-state Wars: An Examination of Civil, Regional, and Intercommunal Wars, 1816-2014. CQ Press. .
 Guerra, Margarita (1984). Historia General del Perú. La República Aristocrática. Tomo XI. Primera Edición. Lima: Editor Carlos Milla Batres. Depósito Legal: B. 22436-84 (XI).
 Orrego, Juan Luis (2000). La República Oligárquica  (1850-1950). En Historia del Perú. Lima: Lexus Editores. 

Wars involving Peru
Conflicts in 1894
Conflicts in 1895